Simon Nicholas Roberts (born 11 September 1926) is a former South African cricketer.  Roberts was a right-handed batsman who was a leg break bowler.  He was born at Durban, Natal Province.

In 1947, Roberts made a single Minor Counties Championship appearance for Cambridgeshire against Lincolnshire.

Roberts also played first-class cricket for Cambridge University against Middlesex, making his debut in 1947.  From 1947 to 1949, he represented the university in 6 first-class matches, with his final appearance coming against Middlesex.  In his 6 first-class matches, he scored 158 runs at a batting average of 15.80, with a high score of 49*.

References

External links
Simon Roberts at Cricinfo
Simon Roberts at CricketArchive

1926 births
2009 deaths
Cricketers from Durban
South African cricketers
Cambridgeshire cricketers
Cambridge University cricketers
Alumni of Gonville and Caius College, Cambridge
Alumni of Michaelhouse